State Route 743 (SR 743) is a short east–west state highway in southwestern Ohio, a U.S. state. The highway's western terminus is in the village of Moscow at the intersection of Wells Street and 5th Street, a mere two blocks off of U.S. Route 52 (US 52).

Situated in southern Clermont County, SR 743 came into existence in the late 1930s when many highways numbered in the 500s, 600s and 700s were designated throughout Ohio.  The highway generally exists now as it did when it was first designated.

Route description
All of SR 743 is located in southern Clermont County.  No portion of this state highway is incorporated within the National Highway System.

Starting from the intersection of 5th Street and Wells Street in the village of Moscow approximately four blocks east of the Ohio River, SR 743 follows Wells Street east two blocks through a residential area to the US 52 junction.  SR 743 overlaps US 52 heading south for nearly  into rural Washington Township.  The state highway then splits from US 52, and heads east into a predominantly forested setting, with the occasional house appearing along the side of the roadway. SR 743 curves its way around, but in a generally easterly trend, through its intersection with Fruit Ridge Road.  The highway then starts to bend into a more northeastly direction, as it meets Brown Road and then passes underneath the Haul Road for the nearby William H. Zimmer Power Station.  Some open grassy knolls start to line the sides of SR 743 amidst the forested terrain as the highway makes its way up to its junction with SR 756.  Continuing northeast, SR 743 passes a mix of grassy fields and tree patches, with houses appearing here and there.  Ultimately, SR 743 turns due east, and follows this path to its intersection with Bees Run Road in the residential hamlet of Point Isabel.  The highway turns due north there, and continues in that direction through its endpoint at SR 222.

History
SR 743 was first designated in 1937 along the routing through Moscow and Washington Township in Clermont County that it occupies today.  No changes of major significance have taken place to the routing of this state highway since its creation.

Major intersections

References

743
Transportation in Clermont County, Ohio